The coat of arms of the Kingdom of Holland, a client state of Napoleon Bonaparte's French Empire which encompassed most of the modern-day state of the Netherlands, was instituted in 1806.

When the Emperor Napoleon proposed that his younger brother Louis Napoleon Bonaparte should become the king of a new kingdom, a state that would replace and succeed the age-old Dutch republic, at that time called the "Batavian Republic". He chose the name "Holland", after the most important province, as "Hollande" was much used in France as a name for the Netherlands.

The statute described the royal arms and mentioned a royal crown. On 20 May 1807 a precise drawing of the royal coat of arms was approved by the king. The crown was topped with an orb with a cross.

In practice crowns without a cross became part of the crosses of Louis' Order of Knighthood, the Order of the Union, and the new coins. The second coat of arms, approved on 6 February 1806, showed no cross.

As the country was ruined by the Napoleonic wars and the resulting lack of trade there was no opportunity for a coronation. The crown existed on paper alone until the French annexed the country in 1810. In 1813 the Dutch "chose" a new sovereign ruler, later king, William I who had a new crown, the crown of the Netherlands designed and wrought in gilded silver.

See also
Circlet
Coronet
Diadem
Helmet
Tiara
Papal tiara
Crown jewels
List of royal crowns

References 
 Hubert de Vries, "Wapens van de Nederlanden", Amsterdam 1995

Symbols introduced in 1813
Holland
Dutch monarchy
Holland
Holland
Kingdom of Holland